The Malay language has a complex system of styles, titles and honorifics which are used extensively in Brunei Darussalam, Indonesia, Malaysia, Singapore, and southern parts of the Philippines.

Brunei, Malaysia, Singapore and several provinces in Indonesia regularly award honorary and life titles.  What follows in this article is specific to the Malaysian system.  References to Brunei and Indonesia are given when pertinent.

In Malaysia, all non-hereditary titles can be granted to both men and women.  Every title has a form of address which can be used by the wife of the title holder.  This form is not used by the husband of a titled woman; such a woman will bear a title which is the same as a titled man.

Former use
Singapore, whose Malay royalty was abolished by the British colonial government in 1891, has adopted civic titles for its leaders.

The Philippines historically used Malay titles during its pre-Hispanic period (especially under Bruneian influence), as evidenced by the titles of historical figures such as Rajah Sulayman, Lakandula, and Dayang Kalangitan.  Malay titles are still used by the royal houses of Sulu, Maguindanao, Buayan, and Maranao on the southern Philippine island of Mindanao, but these are retained on a traditional basis, as the 1987 Constitution explicitly reaffirms the abolition of royal and noble titles in the republic.

Indonesia, meanwhile, as a republic, does not recognise hereditary rulers and aristocratic systems.  However, one traditional Javanese monarchy is still recognised in Indonesia, namely the Sultanate of Yogyakarta.  The hereditary Sultans will hold the position as governor of the province, which is recognised by the government.  Nevertheless, other royal titles and honours are still used as courtesy titles throughout the republic.

Usage
The sequence that should be used when formally writing or addressing a person's name is: honorary style, professional rank, royal hereditary title, federal title, state title, non-royal hereditary title, Doctor (of medicine or philosophy), Haji/Hajah (for Muslim men and women who have performed the Hajj), name.

For instance, in Brunei, the title for one of Bruneian traditional ministers (Pehin-Pehin Cheteria) whose honorary title would be Yang Berhormat, profession rank is Pehin Orang Kaya Seri Lela, state title is Dato Seri Setia and traditional Bruneian Malay prefix title for non-royalty is Awang.  An example would be Yang Berhormat Pehin Orang Kaya Seri Lela Dato Seri Setia Awang Haji Abdul Rahman bin Dato Setia Haji Mohamed Taib.

When in the home state, the state title may precede the federal title.  An example is the current Premier of Sarawak, Abang Abdul Rahman Zohari Abang Openg, whose federal title is Tan Sri and whose state title is Datuk Patinggi.  His title will be expressed as either:
Yang Amat Berhormat Tan Sri Datuk Patinggi (Dr.) Abang Haji Abdul Rahman Zohari bin Tun Datuk Abang Haji Openg (federally)
Yang Amat Berhormat Datuk Patinggi Tan Sri (Dr.) Abang Haji Abdul Rahman Zohari bin Tun Datuk Abang Haji Openg (in his home state).

Another exception is when a person has received an award from a state other than the person's home state; when visiting the award-bestowing state, that state's title will take the place of a home state's title (if any).  As an example, the current Prime Minister, Anwar Ibrahim will be titled as follows:
Yang Amat Berhormat Dato' Seri Anwar bin Ibrahim (federally)
Yang Amat Berhormat Datuk Seri Panglima Anwar bin Ibrahim (in Sabah)
Yang Amat Berhormat Dato' Seri Utama Anwar bin Ibrahim (in Penang)
Yang Amat Berhormat Dato' Seri Diraja Anwar bin Ibrahim (in Perlis)

A style carried by virtue of royal title always trumps those carried by non-royal titles.  Male royals may choose to append 'al-Haj' to their name instead of using 'Haji'.  The following example is correct:
Yang Amat Mulia General Tengku Dato' (name) al-Haj.

Malay royalty
The following titles are hereditary and reserved for royal families of the royal families of Brunei and nine royal states of Malaysia.  Brunei is the only absolute monarchy left in the Malay's world, and the monarchy has the power in the government.

Brunei
The following styles and official titles are used for members of the royal house in Brunei Darussalam.  As Brunei is an absolute monarchy, it is important to address royal family members with the correct title.  Improper usage may cause discomfort.

The Sultan and the Queen of Brunei are styled as Kebawah Duli Yang Maha Mulia Paduka Seri Baginda (KDYMM PSB) (literally 'his/her most glorious majesty who is raised most high'):
Sultan dan Yang di-Pertuan Negara Brunei Darussalam is the official title of the Sultan of Brunei, styled as Kebawah Duli Yang Maha Mulia Paduka Seri Baginda Sultan (His Majesty the Sultan);
Raja Isteri (literally 'King's Wife'; Queen Consort), is the official title of the ruler's most senior consort, styled as Kebawah Duli Yang Maha Mulia Paduka Seri Baginda Raja Isteri (Her Majesty the Queen);
Pengiran Isteri (literally 'Princess Consort') is the official title of the ruler's junior consort, styled as Duli Yang Teramat Mulia Paduka Seri (Her Royal Highness);
Begawan Sultan the office of the former abdicated sultan (last held by Omar Ali Saifuddien III who abdicated in favour of his son), styled as Kebawah Duli Yang Teramat Mulia Paduka Seri Begawan Sultan (His Majesty Begawan Sultan);
Begawan Raja is the official title for the queen mother, styled as Kebawah Duli Yang Teramat Mulia Paduka Suri Seri (Her Majesty Begawan Queen).

For those who have blood-ties with the royal family who are married, styled as Prince or Princess in English, and given the hereditary honorific prefix Pengiran:
Pengiran Muda Mahkota is the official title of the heir-apparent and the crown prince, styled as Duli Yang Teramat Mulia Paduka Seri (His Royal Highness);
Pengiran Muda is the official title of a blood prince, they are styled differently:
The sons of the Sultan, if they do not have supplementary titles, are styled Duli Yang Teramat Mulia Paduka Seri (His Royal Highness);
The sons of the Pengiran Muda Mahkota are styled Yang Teramat Mulia (His Royal Highness);
Pengiran Anak Puteri is the title for the daughters of the Sultan, they are styled Yang Teramat Mulia Paduka Seri (Her Royal Highness);
Pengiran Anak Isteri the consorts of the sons of the Sultan, it differs according to different princes:
The consort of the Pengiran Muda Mahkota is styled Yang Teramat Mulia Paduka Seri (Her Royal Highness);
The consort of the Pengiran Perdana Wazir is styled Yang Teramat Mulia and has no English style;
The consort of the other sons of the Sultan is styled Yang Amat Mulia (His Nobleness);
Pengiran Anak is the title for the sultan's other grandchildren. However, they are styled differently:
Daughters of the Pengiran Muda Mahkota are styled Yang Teramat Mulia (Her Royal Highness);
Other grandchildren of the Sultan are styled Yang Amat Mulia with no English equivalent;
Sons-in-law of the Sultan who are elevated to nobility are styled Yang Amat Mulia;
The lower royalty The Cheteria are all entitled to the style Yang Amat Mulia.

Exclusive royal titles for the descendant of Princess Norehsani, the only surviving female heir of the 26th Sultan of Brunei, Ahmad Tajuddin, the uncle of the current Sovereign Sultan Hassanal Bolkiah;
Tengku Putera for male, are styled Yang Amat Mulia (His Nobleness);
Tengku Puteri for female, are styled Yang Amat Mulia (Her Nobleness).

A person who marries a distant member of the royal family (ie: Pengiran) is given the title Pengiran Anak; the title is lost if they divorce.
Pengiran Isteri the wife of a prince, usually with royal heritage;
Pengiran Bini the wife of a prince, usually with non-royal heritage.

According to the Royal Custom (Adat Istiadat), the title of Pengiran will be given to at least five generations of Pengiran Anak descendants (grandchildren, great-grandchildren, and great-great-grandchildren) and they will no longer use the Pengiran Anak titles.

The unmarried children of Pengiran are styled as Awangku for males and Dayangku for females.  Not to be confused with Brunei's equivalent of Mr. (Awang) and Ms. (Dayang), which applies to everyone with no royal titles.

Malaysia
Kebawah Duli Yang Maha Mulia (KDYMM) (literally 'He/She Whom is The Dust of The Almighty') is used for the Yang di-Pertuan Agong, and state rulers alike.  The title is a reference to the rulers being subjected to the Law of God, with their powers being dust compared to the power of Allah.  However, the Yang di-Pertuan Agong also uses the prefix 'Seri Paduka Baginda' (literally, 'Conqueror Majesty') and in English, his title is often translated as 'His Majesty'.  However, the style differs from state to state as according to states' tradition.

Federal
Titles of Malaysian royalty and rulers:
Yang di-Pertuan Agong (literally, 'He who is made Supreme Lord' but usually 'Supreme Head' or 'Paramount Ruler') is the official title of the ruler of all Malaysia, elected from among the nine heads of the royal families.  The title is often glossed 'King' in English.  He is styled as Kebawah Duli Yang Maha Mulia Seri Paduka Baginda (His Majesty).
Timbalan Yang di-Pertuan Agong (literally, 'Deputy of He who is made Supreme Lord', but usually 'Deputy Supreme Head' or 'Deputy Paramount Ruler') is the official title of the deputy ruler of all Malaysia who is also elected from among the nine heads of the royal families.  The title is often glossed 'Deputy King' in English.  He is styled as Kebawah Duli Yang Maha Mulia (His Majesty).
Raja Permaisuri Agong (literally, 'The Supreme Lady') is the official title of the consort of the ruler of Malaysia.  The title is often glossed 'Queen' in English.  She is styled as Kebawah Duli Yang Maha Mulia Seri Paduka Baginda (Her Majesty).
Yang di-Pertua Negeri (YDPN) is not a royal title, but the title of 'The Head of the State' (the 'Supreme Head') for the state of Penang, Melaka, Sabah, and Sarawak, which do not have hereditary rulers.  Yang di-Pertua Negeri is installed by His Majesty Yang di-Pertuan Agong.  The title is sometimes translated as 'Governor' in English.  They are styled Tuan/Puan Yang Terutama (His/Her Excellency).

Negeri Sembilan
Yamtuan Besar, officially Yang di-Pertuan Besar (literally 'He who is made Chief Ruler',) is the title of the ruler of Negeri Sembilan.  He is styled as Duli Yang Maha Mulia (His Royal Highness).
Tunku Ampuan Besar ('The Chief Royal Lady') is the title of the queen consort of royal parentage for Negeri Sembilan.  She is styled as Duli Yang Maha Mulia (Her Royal Highness).
Tunku Ampuan ('The Royal Lady') is the title of the queen dowager.  She is styled as Yang Maha Mulia (Her Royal Highness).
Tunku Puan Besar ('The Senior Royal Lady') is the title of the senior queen dowager.  She is styled Yang Maha Mulia (Her Royal Highness).
The children of rulers have the title and style of Yang Amat Mulia (His Highness) Tunku.
The fiefs of the state, the Undangs are for the areas (luak) of Jelebu, Johol, Sungai Ujong, and Rembau.  They are all styled Yang Teramat Mulia (His Highness).  Their spouses are titled Tok Puan with the style Yang Mulia (Her Highness).
The Tunku Besar of Tampin, a semi-autonomous area ruled by the Al-Qadri family.  He is styled Yang Teramat Mulia (His Highness).  His spouse is accorded the title of Tunku Isteri with the style of Yang Mulia (Her Highness).
The Tunku Besar (literally the 'Senior Prince') of Seri Menanti is the title of eldest son of the Yang di-Pertuan Besar.  He is styled Yang Amat Mulia (His Highness).

Selangor
Sultan and Yang di-Pertuan is the title of the ruler of Selangor.  He is styled Duli Yang Maha Mulia (His Royal Highness).  The style is also the title of the state anthem.
Tengku Ampuan Selangor is the title of the queen consort of royal parentage.  She is styled as Duli Yang Maha Mulia (Her Royal Highness).
Tengku Permaisuri Selangor is the title for queen consort of non-royal blood.  She is styled as Duli Yang Maha Mulia (Her Royal Highness).
Che' Puan Besar Selangor is the title for second consort of non-royal blood of the ruler if he is still marries with queen consort.  She is styled as Yang Teramat Mulia (Her Highness).
Tengku Ampuan (literally 'Queen Dowager') is the title of the queen dowager is she of royal blood.  She is styled as Yang Maha Mulia (Her Royal Highness).
Paduka Bonda Raja (literally 'Royal Mother') is the title of the Sultan's mother who was not installed as a Tengku Ampuan.  She is styled as Yang Maha Mulia (Her Royal Highness).
Permaisuri  is the title of the queen dowager if she is not of royal blood.  She is styled Yang Amat Mulia (Her Highness).
Raja Muda Selangor (literally means 'Younger King') is the title of the heir apparent.  He is then styled Duli Yang Teramat Mulia (His Royal Highness).
Raja Puan Muda Selangor (literally 'Younger Lady King') is the title of the consort of the heir apparent if she is of royal blood.  She is styled Duli Yang Teramat Mulia (Her Royal Highness).
Che' Puan Muda Selangor is the title of the consort of the heir apparent if she is not of royal blood.  She is styled Yang Teramat Mulia (Her Highness).
The other children of the Sultan is titled and styled Yang Amat Mulia (His/Her Highness) Tengku.

Perlis
Raja and Yang di-Pertuan is the title of the ruler of Perlis.  He is styled as Duli Yang Maha Mulia (His Royal Highness).
Raja Perempuan (literally 'Female Queen') is the title of the queen consort of Perlis.  She is styled Duli Yang Maha Mulia (Her Royal Highness).
Raja Perempuan Besar is the title of the queen dowager.  She is styled Yang Maha Mulia (Her Royal Highness).
Raja Muda (literally 'Younger King') is the title of the heir apparent.  He is styled Duli Yang Teramat Mulia (His Royal Highness).
Raja Puan Muda (literally 'Younger Lady King') is the title of the consort of the heir apparent.  She is styled Duli Yang Teramat Mulia (Her Royal Highness).
The other children of the Raja and Raja Muda are styled as Yang Amat Mulia (His/Her Highness) Syed/Sharifah, with the suffix house name of Jamalullail.

Terengganu
Sultan and Yang di-Pertuan is the title of the ruler of the state of Terengganu.  He is styled Kebawah Duli Yang Maha Mulia (His Royal Highness).
Tengku Ampuan Besar is the title of the queen consort of the state for queens of royal blood.  She is styled as Kebawah Duli Yang Maha Mulia (Her Royal Highness).
Permaisuri is the title of the queen consort if she is not of royal blood initially used by Sultanah Nur Zahirah until it was changed by Sultan Mizan.  A Permaisuri is styled Kebawah Duli Yang Maha Mulia (Her Royal Highness).
Sultanah is the title that is awarded to the consort of the Sultan.  She is styled Kebawah Duli Yang Maha Mulia (Her Royal Highness).
Tengku Ampuan is the title of the queen dowager.  She is styled as Yang Maha Mulia (Her Royal Highness).
Tengku Ampuan Tua (literally 'Old Royal Lady') is the title of the senior queen dowager.  She is styled as Yang Maha Mulia (Her Royal Highness).
Tengku Besar is the title of the Sultan's mother if she has not been crowned.  She is styled as Yang Teramat Mulia (Her Highness).
Yang di-Pertuan Muda (literally 'He who is made the young Lord') is the title of the heir apparent.  He is styled Duli Yang Teramat Mulia (His Royal Highness).
Tengku Puan Muda is the title of the consort of the heir apparent if she is of royal blood.  She is styled Duli Yang Teramat Mulia (Her Royal Highness).
To' Puan Seri is the title of the consort of the heir apparent if she is not of royal blood.  She is styled Yang Amat Berbahagia (The Most Felicitous).
The other children of the Sultan is styled and titled Yang Amat Mulia (His/Her Highness) Tengku.

Kedah
Sultan and Yang di-Pertuan is the title of the ruler of the state of Kedah.  He is styled Kebawah Duli Yang Maha Mulia (His Royal Highness).
Sultanah is the title of the ruler's consort, of royal blood or not.  She is styled Kebawah Duli Yang Maha Mulia (Her Royal Highness).
Tunku Ampuan (archaic) was the title of queen dowager of the ruler of royal blood.  She was styled Yang Maha Mulia (Her Royal Highness).
Che' Puan Besar (literally 'Great Grand Lady') is the title of the queen dowager if she is not of royal blood.  She is styled Yang Maha Mulia (Her Royal Highness).
Raja Muda (literally 'Crown Prince') is the title of the heir apparent.  He is styled Duli Yang Teramat Mulia (His Royal Highness).
Raja Puan Muda (literally 'Crown Princess') is the title of the consort of the heir apparent.  She is styled Duli Yang Teramat Mulia (Her Royal Highness).
Tunku Mahkota (literally 'Deputy Crown Prince') is the title of the second heir apparent.  He is titled Duli Yang Amat Mulia (His Royal Highness).
Tunku Puan Mahkota (literally 'Deputy Crown Princess') is the title of the consort of the second heir apparent.  She is titled Duli Yang Amat Mulia (Her Royal Highness).
The other children of the Sultan and Raja Muda are titled and styled Yang Teramat Mulia (His/Her Highness) Tunku.

Kelantan
 Al-Sultan and Yang di-Pertuan Kelantan is the title of the ruler of the state of Kelantan.  He is styled Kebawah Duli Yang Maha Mulia (His Royal Highness).
Raja Perempuan Kelantan (literally 'Lady King') is the title of the consort of the Sultan if she is of royal blood.  She is styled Duli Yang Maha Mulia (Her Royal Highness).
Sultanah Kelantan is the title of the consort of the Sultan if she is not of royal blood.  She is styled Duli Yang Maha Mulia (Her Highness).
Raja Perempuan (literally 'Queen Dowager') is the title of the queen dowager if she is of royal blood.  She is styled Yang Maha Mulia (Her Royal Highness).
Tengku Mahkota Kelantan (literally 'Crown Prince') is the title of the heir apparent.  He is styled Yang Teramat Mulia (His Royal Highness).
Tengku Ampuan Mahkota Kelantan (literally 'Crown Princess') is the title of the consort of the heir apparent if she is of royal blood.  She is styled Yang Teramat Mulia (Her Royal Highness).
Che Puan Mahkota Kelantan (equivalent to 'Crown Princess') is the title of the consort of the heir apparent if she is not of royal blood.  She is styled Yang Teramat Mulia (Her Highness).
The other children of the Al-Sultan are titled Yang Amat Mulia (His/Her Highness) Tengku.  If they hold certain palace positions, they are titled Yang Berhormat Mulia (His/Her Highness The Honourable) Tengku.

Pahang
Sultan and Yang di-Pertuan is the title of the ruler of the state of Pahang.  He is styled Kebawah Duli Yang Maha Mulia (His Royal Highness).
Tengku Ampuan Pahang (literally 'Queen Consort') is the title of the consort of the Sultan if she is of royal blood.  She is styled Kebawah Duli Yang Maha Mulia (Her Royal Highness).
Sultanah Pahang is the title of the consort of the Sultan if she is not of royal blood.  She is styled Duli Yang Maha Mulia (Her Royal Highness).
Tengku Ampuan Besar Pahang is the title of the queen dowager if she is of royal blood.  She is styled as Yang Maha Mulia (Her Royal Highness).
Cik Puan Besar Pahang is the title of the queen dowager if she is not of royal blood.  She is styled Yang Amat Mulia (Her Highness).
Tengku Mahkota Pahang (literally 'Crown Prince') is the title of the heir apparent.  He is styled Kebawah Duli Yang Teramat Mulia (His Royal Highness).
Tengku Puan Pahang (literally 'Crown Princess') is the title of the consort of the heir apparent if she is of royal blood.  She is styled Kebawah Duli Yang Teramat Mulia (Her Royal Highness).
Cik Puan Pahang (equivalent to 'Princess Consort') is the title of the consort of the heir apparent if she is not of royal blood.  She is styled Yang Teramat Mulia (Her Highness).
The children of the Sultan are titled and styled Yang Amat Mulia (His/Her Highness) Tengku.  The children of the Tengku Mahkota are titled and styled Yang Mulia (His/Her Highness).

Johor
Sultan and Yang di-Pertuan is the title of the ruler of Johor.  He is styled Duli Yang Maha Mulia (His Majesty).
Permaisuri is the title for a queen consort of royal blood (direct daughter of the sultan) outside the Johor Sultanate's blood line.  She is styled Duli Yang Maha Mulia (Her Majesty).
Sultanah is the title for his wife with non-royal blood or for his wife of noble birth (distant royal relatives).  She is styled Duli Yang Maha Mulia (Her Majesty).
Tunku Ampuan (archaic) is the title for the consort of the Sultan if she is from a junior branch of the Johor Royal Family.  She was styled Duli Yang Maha Mulia (Her Royal Highness).  This was last used in 1895 for Tunku Ampuan Ungku Maimunah.
Tunku Puan is the title of the queen dowager of royal blood.  She is styled Yang Amat Mulia (Her Highness).
Enche' Besar is the title awarded to the mother of the Sultan if she is not of royal blood.  She is styled Yang Amat Mulia (Her Highness).
Tunku Mahkota (literally 'Crown Prince') is the title of the heir apparent.  He is styled Duli Yang Amat Mulia (His Royal Highness).
Isteri Tunku Mahkota (literally 'Consort of the Crown Prince') is the title of the consort of the heir apparent.  She is styled Yang Amat Mulia (Her Highness).
Che' Puan Besar (literally 'Madame') is the title of the consort of the heir apparent if she is not of royal blood.  She is styled as Yang Amat Mulia (Her Highness).
Raja Muda (literally 'Younger King') is the title of the first son of the heir apparent.  The situation is similar to France where during the reign of Louis XIV, his son was titled the le Grand Dauphin and his grandson was also titled le Petit Dauphin.  He is titled Duli Yang Amat Mulia (His Royal Highness).
The other children of the Sultan are titled and styled Yang Amat Mulia (His/Her Highness) Tunku.
Related Royal paternal hereditary titles to Tunku, are Ungku and Tengku or prince.  Denotes particular lineages of the Royal Family of Johor with the style of Yang Mulia (His/ Her Highness).

Perak
Sultan, Yang di-Pertuan dan Raja Pemerintah is the title of the ruler of Perak.  He is styled Duli Yang Maha Mulia Paduka Seri (His Royal Highness).
Raja Perempuan Perak is the title of the consort of the ruler if she is of royal blood.  She is styled Duli Yang Maha Mulia (Her Royal Highness).
Raja Permaisuri Perak is the title of the consort of the ruler if she is not of royal blood.  She is styled Duli Yang Maha Mulia (Her Royal Highness).
Raja Perempuan is the title of the queen dowager if she is of royal blood.  Would be granted the style of Yang Maha Mulia (Her Royal Highness).
Raja Permaisuri is the title of the queen dowager is she is not of royal blood.  She is styled Yang Maha Mulia (Her Royal Highness).
Raja Muda Perak is the title of the heir apparent.  He is styled Duli Yang Teramat Mulia (His Royal Highness).
Raja Puan Besar Perak is the title of the consort of the heir apparent if she is of royal blood.  She is styled Duli Yang Teramat Mulia (Her Royal Highness).
Che Puan Besar Perak is the title of the consort of the heir apparent if she is not of royal blood.  She is styled Yang Teramat Mulia (Her Highness).
Raja di-Hilir Perak is the title of second heir apparent.  He is styled Duli Yang Amat Mulia (His Royal Highness).
Raja Puan Muda Perak is the title of the consort of the second heir apparent if she is of royal blood.  She is styled Duli Yang Amat Mulia (Her Royal Highness).
Che Puan Muda Perak is the title of the consort of the second heir apparent if she is not of royal blood.  She is styled Yang Amat Mulia (Her Highness).
The other children of the Sultan and Raja Bergelar is styled Yang Teramat Mulia (His/Her Highness) Raja/Engku.

Federal titles
In Malaysia, the Yang di-Pertuan Agong (King of Malaysia) grants honours to recipients nominated by the Government of Malaysia as awards which are honorary and non-hereditary.  These honours may also be revoked by the Yang di-Pertuan Agong or returned by the individual.  Some of the highest honours bestowed carries with them the titles of Tun, Tan Sri, or Datuk.

There is a maximum number of Malaysian subjects who may be award-holders at any one time.  These numerical limits apply only to Malaysian subjects.  Foreigners may be awarded such titles in a supernumerary and honorary capacity, and may use the title locally.

Tun
The Tun title has existed in Malaysian society for hundreds of years.  In ancient times, Tun was an honorific title used by noble people of royal lineage, inherited by the male descendants.  Over time, the Tun title has become a title conferred by the Yang di-Pertuan Agong to the most-deserving recipient who has highly contributed to the nation.

Tun is the most senior federal title awarded to recipients of either the Seri Maharaja Mangku Negara (Grand Commander of the Order of the Defender of the Realm) (SMN) or Seri Setia Mahkota (Grand Commander of the Order of Loyalty to the Crown of Malaysia) (SSM).  However, the SMN and SSM are not the highest federal awards, ranking fourth and fifth, respectively.  There may not be more than 25 (SMN) and 35 (SSM) living holders of each of these awards respectively at any one time.  The title for the wife of a Tun is called Toh Puan.  The recipients and their wives are then bestowed with the style of Yang Amat Berbahagia or (The Most Felicitous).

The SMN is usually awarded to newly appointed Yang di-Pertua Negeri (YDPN), and to all the retired Prime Ministers of Malaysia, with the exception of Tunku Abdul Rahman (he is the Prince of the state of Kedah), Najib Razak, Muhyiddin Yassin, and Ismail Sabri Yaakob.  The most senior state titles of Dato Seri Utama and Datuk Seri Utama are of equivalent rank with Tun.

Examples:
Yang Amat Berbahagia (The Most Felicitous) Tun Dr. Mahathir Mohamad ;
Yang Amat Berbahagia (The Most Felicitous) Tun Dr. Ling Liong Sik .

Tan Sri
Tan Sri is the second-most senior federal title and a honorific, used to denote recipients of the Panglima Mangku Negara (Commander of the Order of the Defender of the Realm) (PMN) and the Panglima Setia Mahkota (Commander of the Order of Loyalty to the Crown of Malaysia) (PSM).  The wife of a Tan Sri is called Puan Sri.  The recipients and their wives are then bestowed with the style of Yang Berbahagia or (The Felicitous).  State title Dato Sri and Dato Seri share equivalent rank with Tan Sri.

Examples:
Yang Berhormat Tan Sri Dato' Haji Muhyiddin Yassin ;
Yang Berbahagia Tan Sri Datuk Seri Panglima Abdul Gani Patail ;
Yang Berbahagia Tan Sri Dr Runme Shaw, ;
Yang Berbahagia Tan Sri Dato' Seri Michelle Yeoh ;
Yang Berbahagia Tan Sri Dato Sri Dr Muhammad Shafee Abdullah .

Datuk

Datuk is a federal title that has been conferred since 1965.  It is limited to recipients of Panglima Jasa Negara (Commander of the Order of Meritorious Service) (PJN) and Panglima Setia Diraja (Commander of the Order of Loyalty to the Royal Family of Malaysia) (PSD).  There may be up to 200 living PJN holders and 200 living PSD holders at any one time.  The wife of a Datuk is called a Datin.  The recipients and their wives are then bestowed with the style of Yang Berbahagia (The Felicitous).

Examples:
Yang Berbahagia Datuk Lee Chong Wei ;
Yang Berbahagia Datuk Punch Gunalan ;
Yang Berbahagia Datuk Ahmad Fauzi Hasan;
Yang Berbahagia Datuk Prof. Dr. Mohamad Akram Laldin.

State titles
In Malaysia, state honours are awarded by the respective heads of the thirteen states.  Such titles are honorary and non-hereditary.  State titles may be revoked or suspended by the head of state, or may be returned by the individual.  Dato' Sri or Dato' Seri (sometimes Dato’ is spelled and pronounced Datuk in some states) is the highest state title conferred by the Ruler on the most deserving recipients who have contributed greatly to the nation or state.  It ranks below the federal title Tun, and is an honour equivalent to federal title Tan Sri.  The wife of a recipient is Datin Sri or Datin Seri.  In many cases, the number of Malaysian nationals who may hold a state title or honour at one time is limited.  Such limits do not apply to foreigners.

{|class=wikitable style="margin-left:auto; margin-right:auto; border:none"
!title!!awarding state(s)!!associated honour(s)!!variant
|-
|rowspan=2 align=center|Dato Sri||rowspan=2|||Knight Grand Commander of Most Exalted Order of the Star of Sarawak (SBS)||Pehin Sri
|-
|Knight Commander of the Most Exalted Order of the Star of Sarawak (PNBS)||Dato Sri
|-
|rowspan=29 align=center|Dato' Seri||rowspan=6|||Member of the Supreme Order of Sri Mahawangsa (DMK)||Dato' Seri Utama
|-
|(SMDK)||Dato' Seri Utama
|-
|Grand Commander of the Order of Loyalty to Sultan Abdul Halim Mu'adzam Shah (SHMS)||Dato’ Seri Diraja
|-
|Knight Grand Commander of the Glorious Order of the Crown of Kedah (SGMK)||Dato’ Seri Wira
|-
|Knight Grand Commander of the Exalted Order of the Crown of Kedah (SPMK)||Dato’ Seri
|-
|Knight Grand Companion of the Order of Loyalty to the Royal House of Kedah (SSDK)||Dato’ Seri
|-
|rowspan=4|||Principal Grand Knight of the Order of Loyalty to Negeri Sembilan (SUNS)||Dato’ Seri Utama
|-
|Knight Grand Commander of the Grand Order of Tuanku Jaafar (SPTJ)||Dato’ Seri
|-
|Grand Knight of the Order of Loyalty to Tuanku Muhriz (SSTM)||Dato’ Seri
|-
|Grand Knight of the Order of Loyalty to Negeri Sembilan (SSNS)||Dato’ Seri
|-
|rowspan=3|||Knight Grand Commander of the Order of the Defender of State (DUPN)||Dato' Seri Utama
|-
|Knight Commander of the Order of the Defender of State (DPPN)||Dato' Seri
|-
|Commander of the Order of the Defender of State (DGPN)||Dato' Seri
|-
|rowspan=6|||Perak Family Order of Sultan Azlan Shah (Ordinary Class) (SPSA)||Dato’ Seri Diraja
|-
|Perak Family Order of Sultan Nazrin Shah (Ordinary Class) (SPSN)||Dato’ Seri Diraja
|-
|Grand Knight of the Azlanii Royal Family Order (DSA)||Dato’ Seri
|-
|Grand Knight of the Order of Cura Si Manja Kini (SPCM)||Dato’ Seri
|-
|Grand Knight of the Order of Taming Sari (SPTS)||Dato’ Seri Panglima
|-
|Knight Grand Commander of the Order of the Perak State Crown (SPMP)||Dato’ Seri
|-
|rowspan=5|||Member of the Order of Dato’ Bendahara Sri Jamalullail (DBSJ)||Dato’ Seri DiRaja Bendahara Negara
|-
|Knight Grand Companion of the Order of the Gallant Prince Syed Putra Jamalullail (SSPJ)||Dato’ Seri Diraja
|-
|Knight Grand Companion of the Order of the Gallant Prince Syed Sirajuddin Jamalullail (SSSJ)||Dato’ Seri Diraja
|-
|Knight Grand Companion of the Order of Prince Syed Sirajuddin Jamalullail of Perlis (SPSJ)||Dato’ Seri Setia DiRaja
|-
|Knight Grand Commander of the Order of the Crown of Perlis (SPMP)||Dato’ Seri
|-
|rowspan=2|||Knight Grand Commander of the Order of the Crown of Selangor (SPMS)||Dato’ Seri
|-
|Knight Grand Companion of the Order of Sultan Sharafuddin Idris Shah (SSIS)||Dato’ Setia
|-
|rowspan=3|||Knight of the Order of Sultan Mizan Zainal Abidin of Terengganu (SUMZ)||Dato’ Seri Utama
|-
|Knight Grand Companion of the Order of Sultan Mizan Zainal Abidin of Terengganu (SSMZ)||Dato’ Seri
|-
|Member Grand Companion of the Order of Sultan Mahmud I of Terengganu (SSMT)||Dato’ Seri
|-
|rowspan=3 align=center|Dato' Sri||rowspan=3|||Grand Royal Knight of the Grand Royal Order of Sultan Ahmad Shah of Pahang (SDSA)||Dato' Sri Diraja
|-
|Grand Knight of the Order of Sultan Ahmad Shah of Pahang (SSAP)||Dato' Sri
|-
|Grand Knight of the Order of the Crown of Pahang (SIMP)||Dato' Indera
|-
|rowspan=5 align=center|Datuk Seri||rowspan=2|||Grand Knight of Order of the Territorial Crown (SUMW)||Datuk Seri Utama
|-
|Grand Commander of Order of the Territorial Crown (SMW)||Datuk Seri
|-
|rowspan=2|||Knight Grand Commander of Exalted Order of Malacca (DUNM)||Datuk Seri Utama
|-
|Grand Commander of Exalted Order of Malacca (DGSM)||Datuk Seri
|-
|||Grand Commander of Order of Kinabalu (SPDK)||Datuk Seri Panglima
|-
|rowspan=2 align=center|Dato' Sri||rowspan=2|||Knight Grand Commander of the Order of the Star of Hornbill Sarawak (DP)||Dato' Patinggi
|-
|Knight Commander of the Order of the Star of Hornbill Sarawak (DA)||Dato’ Amar
|-
|colspan=4 style=background-color:#cccccc|
|-
|rowspan=2 align=center|Dato’||rowspan=2|||Order of Meritorious Service to Sarawak (DJBS)||Datu’
|-
|Commander of the Most Exalted Order of the Star of Sarawak (PSBS)||Dato’
|-
|rowspan=45 align=center|Dato'''||rowspan=6|||Knight Grand Commander of the Order of the Crown of Johor (SPMJ)||Dato|-
|Knight Grand Companion of the Order of Loyalty of Sultan Ismail of Johor (SSIJ)||Dato’
|-
|Grand Knight of the Order of Sultan Ibrahim of Johor (SMIJ)||Dato’
|-
|Knight Commander of the Order of the Crown of Johor (DPMJ)||Dato’
|-
|Knight Companion of the Order of Loyalty of Sultan Ismail of Johor (DSIJ)||Dato’
|-
|Knight of the Order of Sultan Ibrahim of Johor (DMIJ)||Dato’
|-
|rowspan=5|||Knight Commander of the Order of Loyalty to Sultan Abdul Halim Mu'adzam Shah (DHMS)||Dato’ Paduka
|-
|(DMDK)||Dato’ Diraja
|-
|Knight Commander of the Glorious Order of the Crown of Kedah (DGMK)||Dato’ Wira
|-
|Knight Commander of the Exalted Order of the Crown of Kedah (DPMK)||Dato’
|-
|Knight Companion of the Order of Loyalty to the Royal House of Kedah (DSDK)||Dato’
|-
|rowspan=10|||Knight Grand Commander of the Order of the Crown of Kelantan (SPMK)||Dato’
|-
|Knight Commander of the Order of the Crown of Kelantan (DPMK)||Dato’
|-
|Knight Grand Commander of the Order of the Life of the Crown of Kelantan (SJMK)||Dato’
|-
|Knight Commander of the Order of the Life of the Crown of Kelantan (DJMK)||Dato’
|-
|Knight Grand Commander of the Order of the Noble Crown of Kelantan (SPKK)||Dato’
|-
|Knight Commander of the Order of the Noble Crown of Kelantan (DPKK)||Dato’
|-
|Knight Grand Commander of the Order of the Loyalty to the Crown of Kelantan (SPSK)||Dato’
|-
|Knight Commander of the Order of the Loyalty to the Crown of Kelantan (DPSK)||Dato’
|-
|Knight Grand Commander of the Order of the Services to the Crown of Kelantan (SPJK)||Dato’
|-
|Knight Commander of the Order of the Services to the Crown of Kelantan (DPJK)||Dato’
|-
|rowspan=5|||Knight of the Order of Loyalty to Negeri Sembilan (DSNS)||Dato’
|-
|Knight Commander of the Order of Loyalty to Negeri Sembilan (DPNS)||Dato’
|-
|Knight Commander of the Grand Order of Tuanku Jaafar (DPTJ)||Dato’
|-
|Knight of the Order of Loyalty to Tuanku Muhriz (DSTM)||Dato’
|-
|Knight of the Order of Loyal Service to Negeri Sembilan (DBNS)||Dato’
|-
|rowspan=2|||Knight Companion of the Order of Sultan Ahmad Shah of Pahang (DSAP)||Dato|-
|Knight Companion of the Order of the Crown of Pahang (DIMP)||Dato|-
|rowspan=2|||Companion of the Order of the Defender of State (DMPN)||Dato'''
|-
|Officer of the Order of the Defender of State (DSPN)||Dato
|-
|rowspan=3|||Knight of the Order of Cura Si Manja Kini (DPCM)||Dato’|-
|Knight Commander of the Order of Taming Sari (DPTS)||Dato’ Pahlawan|-
|Knight Commander of the Order of the Perak State Crown (DPMP)||Dato’|-
|rowspan=6|||Knight Companion of the Order of the Gallant Prince Syed Sirajuddin Jamalullail (DSSJ)||Dato’ Paduka|-
|Grand Commander of the Order of Prince Syed Sirajuddin Jamalullail of Perlis (DWSJ)||Dato’ Wira|-
|Knight Commander of the Order of the Crown of Perlis (DPMP)||Dato’|-
|Knight Commander of the Order of the Gallant Prince Syed Sirajuddin Jamalullail (DSPJ)||Dato’|-
|Knight Commander of the Order of the Gallant Prince Syed Putra Jamalullail (DPPJ)||Dato’|-
|Knight Commander of the Order of Prince Syed Sirajuddin Jamalullail of Perlis (DPSJ)||Dato’|-
|rowspan=2|||Knight Commander of the Order of the Crown of Selangor (DPMS)||Dato’|-
|Knight Companion of the Order of Sultan Sharafuddin Idris Shah (DSIS)||Dato’|-
|rowspan=4|||Knight Grand Commander of the Order of the Crown of Terengganu (SPMT)||Dato’|-
|Knight Companion of the Order of Sultan Mizan Zainal Abidin of Terengganu (DSMZ)||Dato’|-
|Member Knight Companion of the Order of Sultan Mahmud I of Terengganu (DSMT)||Dato’|-
|Knight Commander of the Order of the Crown of Terengganu (DPMT)||Dato’|-
|rowspan=6 align=center|Datuk||||Knight Commander of the Order of the Territorial Crown (PMW)||Datuk|-
|rowspan=3|||Knight Commander of the Exalted Order of Malacca (DCSM)||Datuk Wira|-
|Companion Class I of the Exalted Order of Malacca (DMSM)||Datuk|-
|Companion Class II of the Exalted Order of Malacca (DPSM)||Datuk|-
|||Commander of the Order of Kinabalu (PGDK)||Datuk|-
|||Grand Commander of the Order of the Star of Hornbill Sarawak (PGBK)||Datuk|}

Pehin
This title is mainly used in Brunei Darussalam.  An example of the title in Brunei would be Pehin Orang Kaya Laila Setia Bakti Di-Raja Dato Laila Utama Haji Awang Isa, the former Minister of Home Affairs and the current Special Adviser to the Sultan of Brunei.  The titles refers to the traditional ministers posts in Brunei.

Pehin Sri
This title is mainly used in Sarawak.  Awarded to individuals who have been appointed as Yang di-Pertua Negeri of Sarawak or equivalent or higher.  An example of the title in Sarawak would be Tun Pehin Sri Haji Abdul Taib Mahmud, Yang di-Pertua Negeri of Sarawak.

Seri Setia
This title is mainly used in Malacca.  Awarded to individuals who have been appointed as Yang di-Pertua Negeri of Malacca or equivalent or higher.  An example of the title in Malacca would be Tun Seri Setia (Dr.) Haji Mohd Ali Rustam, Yang di-Pertua Negeri of Malacca.

JP
Justice of Peace (JP) ranks below all Dato or Datuk.  In Malaysia, Justices of Peace have largely been replaced in magistrates' courts by legally-qualified (first-class) stipendiary magistrates.  However, state governments continue to appoint Justices of Peace as honours.  In 2004, some associations of JPs pressed the federal government to allow JPs to sit as second-class magistrates to reduce the backlog of cases in the courts.

Special cases
If a person has been awarded several honours from different states, the title used varies.  For example, sometimes former Prime Minister, Mahathir Mohamad is usually referred to as YABhg Tun Dr. Mahathir Mohamad anywhere in Malaysia.  However, different terms of address may be used in the states that he visits.  In Sarawak, he will be referred to as YABhg Tun Pehin Sri Mahathir Mohamad as he received the Knight Grand Commander of the Order of the Star of Sarawak (SBS) from the Yang di-Pertua Negeri of Sarawak.  While in Sabah, he is referred to as Tun Datuk Seri Panglima Dr. Mahathir Mohamad, as he received the Grand Commander of the Order of Kinabalu (SPDK) from the Yang di-Pertua Negeri of Sabah.

Honorary styles
The following are used as styles, both before a person's title, and by themselves as forms of address:Tuan Yang Terutama (TYT) ( 'The Most Eminent Master') – the style of a state governor, equivalent to 'Your/His Excellency', and also as a title for serving Ambassadors to Malaysia, e.g. T.Y.T. Tuan Christopher J. LaFleur.  Previously, the archaic equivalent to the style His Excellency was Paduka Yang Mulia (PYM).  This was used by Singapore, Indonesia, and in Malaysia; for other Republic's leaders, while the style for Governors / Yang di-Pertuas were Yang Terutama.Yang Amat Berhormat (YAB) (lit. 'The Most Honorable') – the style of the prime minister, the deputy prime minister, the Premier of Sarawak, the chief ministers and the Menteri Besars of the states, and Tun's who is a member of parliament.  It used to be 'the Right Honorable', but since Malaysia withdrew as a member of the Privy Council in the 1990s, the right to use 'Right Honorable' has been revoked.Yang Berhormat (YB) (lit. 'The Honorable') – the style of members of parliament and state legislative assemblymen.  The prefix Yang Berhormat is also used for recipients of the First and Second Classes of the Johor's Orders of Chivalry, regardless of whether a member of parliament or not.Yang Berhormat Mulia (YBM) (lit. 'His Highness The Honorable') - the style for a member of royalty who is also a member of parliament (e.g. Yang Berhormat Mulia Tengku Zulpuri Shah Raja Puji, the MP for Raub).Yang Amat Arif (YAA) (lit. 'The Very Wise') – the style of the Chief Justice of Malaysia, the President of the Court of Appeal of Malaysia, the Chief Judge of the High Court of Malaya, and the Chief Judge of the High Court of Sabah and Sarawak.Yang Arif (YA) (lit. 'The Wise') – the style of a judge of the Federal Court or Court of Appeal, as well a judicial commissioner or judge of the High Court of Malaya or the High Court of Sabah and Sarawak.  It does not apply to session court judges or magistrates.Yang Amat Berbahagia (YABhg) (lit. 'The Most Felicitous') – the style of persons with the titles Tun or Toh Puan, and the spouses of state governors, the spouse of the prime minister, the spouse of the deputy prime minister, as well as the spouses of state chief ministers.Yang Berbahagia (YBhg) (lit. 'The Felicitous') (and variants thereof) – the styles of persons with a chivalrous title.Yang Hormat (YH) (lit. 'The Respect') – the style for recipients of the First and Second Classes of the Pahang's Orders of Chivalry.

The English versions of these styles follow British usage.  Thus the prime minister, cabinet ministers, senators, state executive councillors and judges of the High Court and above are styled the Honorable or the Right Honorable, although technically it is a solecism to style the prime minister or heads of courts Right Honourable as they are not members of the Privy Council of the United Kingdom.

Other Malay titles by inheritancePermata or Paramata, jewel or princess.Raja Muda crown prince or heir apparent.Simban, literally means 'worshipped'.Pengiran, equivalent to Tengku or prince.Raja ruler determined by hereditary lineage.Tunku, equivalent to Ungku & Tengku or prince.  A hereditary (paternal) title from one of the lineages of the Royal Family of Johor with the style of Yang Mulia (His/ Her Highness).Teuku, name of the royal lineage inherited by the male line used by the Achehnese.  The title Cut, for female will be inherited if her father is a descendant of Teuku or Ulee Balang (title for king/ruler).Raden, a royal family name used in the several Malay Sultanates in Kalimantan, used extensively by the Pontianak Malays.Abang is a title that is particularly found in Sarawak.  Its use is rooted in the appointments of Datuk Patinggi, Datuk Temenggung, Datuk Bandar and Datuk Imam,  centuries before the British colonisation.  The children of these state dignitaries carry the title Abang (male) and Dayang (female).  When an Abang marries a Dayang or a commoner, the issue will get to keep the title.  The issue of a Dayang does not carry a title if they have a non-Abang father.  However, if a Dayang marries a male aristocrat bearing a different title than hers, her issue will be named according to the husband's given title.Awang is the term used for addressing men in Brunei equivalent to Mr. or as a given hereditary name amongst Sarawakian Malay.  Anyone who inherited the name of Awang and Awangku through patrilineal family lineage may later claim the title Pengiran since they are also related to the Brunei Sultanate.  This, however, requires the approval of elders who must consider if he is  mature enough to carry the title – or once he has married.  The change is only eligible for those who inherit the name Awang from their family line.  As for the rule of inheritance of the name, it is the same as Abang.Dayang is the term used for addressing women in Brunei and it is equivalent to Ms. Dayang is also the female issue of an Abang and an Awang (see Abang and Awang).Syed (Malay), Sayyid or Sayed (Philippines), is a title inherited by male descendants, through the male line, from the Prophet Muhammad via his grandsons Hassan and Hussein.  Female descendants are known as Syarifah, Sharifah, or Sayyidah.Meor is a title inherited by the male issue of a Syarifah and non-Syed father.  For females, the first letter of the name comes with 'Ma' as in Ma Mastura.  This is typically used in Perak and few other states such as Terengganu and Kelantan.Megat (Malay), or Pamegat or Gat (Philippines), the title was historically inherited by a lineage from a royal maternal family with a commoner father.  In the Philippines, this survives in common high-born surnames Gatdula and Gatsalian, along with the Order of the Philippines Gat (similar to a knight).Puteri is a title inherited by the female descendant of a Megat.  In the Philippines, Puteri, commonly spelled as Putri, Potri, Potli, or Potre, is used to denote any royal princess of hereditary issue.Tun is a title inherited by the issue of a Puteri, the female descendant of a Megat and a commoner father, in turn inheritable through the male line.  In Pahang, it is the title of a male or female descendant of a Sultan through the female line.  In the upper part of Terengganu, Tun is a title inherited by descendants of the now-abolished Bendahara of Terengganu.Wan is a title inherited through the male line, given to a son or a daughter of a royal-family mother who married a commoner.  This is typically found in Patani, Pahang, Kelantan, Kedah, Terengganu, and Natuna-Anambas.  In Kedah, Wan is the title used by descendants of certain former chief ministers of the state, e.g. the descendants of Wan Mohd Saman.  Wan can also be used as the title for a girl's name, though this is uncommon, e.g. Wan Azizah Wan Ismail.  Wan can also be found in Sarawak, and is somehow related to the state's Syed lineage.  A female issue of Wan carries the title Sharifah.  A Wan may later claim the title Tuanku.  This, however, can only be done after he gains the approval of the elders and is considered mature enough to carry the title.  The change is only eligible for those who inherit the name Wan from their family line.  The issue of a Sharifah does not carry a title if he/she has a non-Wan father.Nik is a title inherited by the issue of a male Nik.  It is typically found in Patani, Kelantan, and Terengganu.Che is a title inherited by the issue of a male Che descendants, and were also used by some Malay nobles in ancient time.  Certain lineage of Raja Jembal descendants also uses the Che title.  However the Che title can also be passed down from a descendant of a female Nik and non-Nik male.  The Che title is commonly found in Pattani, Kedah, Kelantan, and Terengganu.

Other titlesHaji (or Hajjah for female) can be used by people who have completed the Hajj.  This title is abbreviated as 'Hj.' or 'Hjh.'.Tuan literally means 'master'.  Due to its colonial overtones, this term is mostly obsolete, although the title can still be added to Syed and Haji.  It is used for non-titled members of Parliament and State Assemblymen.  In some states like Kelantan, it could also denote one of the royal family.  As an equivalent of Sir, it is used in formal correspondence.  When addressing an audience, the plural form 'tuan-tuan' (gentlemen) is used, usually combined as 'tuan-tuan dan puan-puan' (gentlemen and ladies).Encik (abbreviated 'En.') is equivalent to Mr., and can be used by all men.  Warrant Officers in the Singapore Armed Forces are also referred to as Encik informally.Puan (abbreviated 'Pn.') can be used by all married women.  It is equivalent to Madam, not Mrs., as most married women in Malay-speaking countries do not use the names or surnames of their husbands.  For married women who use their husbands' names, they can be addressed as Puan (husband's name).  It is also used in formal correspondence.  When addressing an audience, the plural form 'puan-puan' (ladies) is used, usually combined with 'tuan-tuan' as 'tuan-tuan dan puan-puan'.Cik is equivalent to Miss, and can be used by all unmarried women.

Related issues
Not all Datuks have lived exemplary lives, and some have been convicted of crimes.  The various rulers have recently taken steps to ensure the integrity of the institution by means of consultation and the revoking of the given titles.

Mahathir Mohamad mentioned that one of the problems with titles in Malaysia is the numbers of them given out.  He stated in an interview "Personally, I feel if you want to give value to anything, it must be limited... if you produce a million Ferrari cars, nobody will care about buying a Ferrari."

The Sultan Nazrin Shah of Perak, stated "That is my view.  You degrade the award and the Ruler has the right to revoke it.  In my opinion, it should be taken away."  He also stated that "Sometimes, I think we give away too many datukships... it dilutes and devalues the award."

In the first government following the independence of Malaya in 1957, 5 of 15 cabinet Ministers were Datuks.  The Minister of Finance of Malaysia at the time, Tan Siew Sin, held the title Justice of Peace.  Later, he was granted a Federal award which carried the title Tun.  The father of Malayan independence, Tunku Abdul Rahman Putra Al-Haj, received no awards and carried the title Tunku, which he inherited as the prince of the state of Kedah.  He was honorarily referred to as Yang Teramat Mulia (YTM).  The Senate held only 14 Datuks, and House of Representatives held only seven.

The Malacca government was criticised for awarding the Datuk title to a non-Malaysian Indian actor, Shah Rukh Khan, for making movies and promoting the Malacca state internationally.

Negeri Sembilan
In 2018, the Yang di-Pertuan Besar of Negeri Sembilan revoked the state honours bestowed upon Mohammad Najib Abdul Razak and his wife, Rosmah Mansor.

Pahang
The Sultan of Pahang revoked the titles of two Datos in 2004.

Selangor
The Datos of Selangor attempted to set up an association of Selangor Dato's.  It received approval from the registrar of societies, but was shelved when the Sultan forbade any Dato' from joining or otherwise risk losing their title.
Four Datuks were removed in 2003 by the Sultan of Selangor.
Dato' Seri Anwar Ibrahim had his title revoked by the Sultan of Selangor on 3 November 2014.
In 2019, the Sultan of Selangor revoked the state honours bestowed upon Najib Razak and his wife, Rosmah Mansor, on 12 September 2022.

See also

Bendahara
Datu – Philippine equivalent of Malay term Dato
Datuk (Minangkabau) – traditional title in Minangkabau community
Style (manner of address)
Yang di-Pertuan Negara

References

External links
Special list of federal and state honours, awarded 2002–2009 — The Star, via Archive.org
Correct forms of address in 
Selangor Sultan strips trader of title — August 2007, Malaysian Bar
NasionCom founder charged with graft — 20 May 2008, The Star, via Archive.org

Malay culture
 

Bruneian culture
Malaysian culture
Singaporean culture

Malaysian nobility
Honorifics by language